Seringia exastia, also known as fringed fire-bush, is a species of flowering plant in the mallow family and is endemic to the Kimberley region of Western Australia.

Description
The species grows as an erect, compact and multi-stemmed shrub with hairy stems. The grey-green, oblong leaves are 15–30 mm long and 6–10 mm wide. The purple flowers may appear from April to December.

Taxonomy
In 1999, Carolyn F. Wilkins described Keraudrenia exastia in the journal Nuytsia from specimens collected on the Dampier Peninsula in 1995. In 2016, Wilkins and Barbara Ann Whitlock changed the name to Seringia exastia in Australian Systematic Botany.

Distribution and habitat
The plant is found in the Carnarvon, Central Ranges, Coolgardie, Dampierland, Gascoyne, Gibson Desert, Great Sandy Desert, Great Victoria Desert, Little Sandy Desert, Murchison, Pilbara and Yalgoo IBRA bioregions of Western Australia. It grows on pindan heathland.

Conservation status
Seringia exastia is listed as "not threatened" by the Western Australian Government Department of Biodiversity, Conservation and Attractions.

References

exastia
Rosids of Western Australia
Malvales of Australia
Taxa named by Carolyn F. Wilkins
Plants described in 1999